Chris Andrews (August 13, 1956 - June 13, 2012) was an entrepreneur who worked with digital media, electronic publishing, and the Internet. He was the first CD-ROM producer, launched the first CD-Recordable system which began the "user generated content" revolution. He developed technologies in other areas including live webcasting, use of audio and video on the internet, and intellectual property.

Andrews was the author of "The Education of a CD-ROM Publisher - An Insiders History of Electronic Publishing."

Andrews' story was featured in a profile on CBS' 60 Minutes. In 2001, he began to pursue the restitution of a building in Vienna, Austria that was taken from his family by the Nazis in World War II. This became a life-changing experience for him, making him an activist in particular in World War II restitution. 

Chris also worked at Hewlett-Packard, NewsBank, Meridian Data, and the National Academy of Recording Arts & Sciences. He launched several companies including the webcast software company Livecast, the multimedia publishing company UniDisc, and VentureMakers LLC - an intellectual property development company.

References

Resources 
 E-commerce patent which Chris Andrews authored
 Article in CMP publications naming Chris Andrews as a Digital Media Pioneer
 Articles from Grammy Program Book about Chris Andrews work as Executive Producer of the Grammy Webcast

Articles about Chris Andrews and World War II restitution 
 Buried In The Past, Brothers Discover Long-Lost Family In Austria
 Spectrum
 English Translation of Chris, du gehst zu weit
 A STEP AHEAD OF HIS TIME
 Two Brothers' Saga of Privilege, Catastrophe, Nazi Humiliation, Suicide and Redemption
 Trying to reclaim a former life
 Palo Alto natives unearth their true heritage

1956 births
2012 deaths
People in information technology
University of Utah alumni
People from Morristown, Vermont
People from Los Altos, California